Joseph Zornado is an American college professor, author of a well-received book in the field of children's literature (Inventing the Child, Garland, 2000/Routledge 2006) as well as a science fiction novel, 2050: Gods of Little Earth, originally published by Speculative Fiction Review in 2007.

Inventing the Child is an account of childhood at the start of a new millennium.  Zornado analyzes several of the dominant notions of childhood which lead to this moment, such as those of Calvin, Freud, and Rousseau, and finally the "consumer childhood" era of Dr. Spock and television.  He argues that the stories we tell our children, from fairy tales to Disney videos, perpetuate the materialism and conformity of our dominant culture.  The book has been praised by writers such as Daniel Quinn, who calls it "among the two or three most eye-opening, illuminating, and important books I've ever read."

The first two volumes of Zornado's 2050 trilogy have been published by Iron Diesel Press.  2050 is set two thousand years after the fall of civilization, when a wanderer named Vilb sets out on a personal journey, only to discover that he may be little more than a pawn of “the gods,” a remnant of ancient human beings who have been waiting for this very moment to fulfill their destiny, not his.  It is set in a post-apocalyptic version of Antarctica, which though habitable remains extremely dry; the lack of water and food has set this new "Little Earth" on a course for crisis, and Vilb holds - though he hardly knows it - both its cause and its resolution.

Zornado is Professor of English and Director of the Faculty Center for Teaching and Learning at Rhode Island College in Providence, Rhode Island.

Publications
Inventing the Child: Culture, Ideology, and the Story of Childhood, NY: Routledge, 2000.  . Paperback published in 2006. Korean translation published in 2011.
2050 Volume I: Gods of Little Earth  —Published in 2015 Merry Blacksmith Press.
 2050 Volume II: The Power at the Bottom of the World —Published in 2015 by Merry Blacksmith Press.
 ‘2050 Volume III: When Immortals Reign” 2015 by Merry Blacksmith Press. 

  Disney and the Dialectics of Desire - Fantasy as Social Practice, Palgrave Macmillan, 2017.

• Professional Writing for Social Work Practice 2nd edition, with Dan Weisman in 2017, Springer Publications 

• Professional Writing for Criminal Justice in 2017 With Dan Weisman and Jill Harrison. Springer Publications. 

• Critical Thinking:    Developing the Intellectual Tools for Social Justice in 2019, from Routledge. 

Living people
Year of birth missing (living people)